Right Back may refer to:

Right back, a player position in association football (soccer)
Right Back (album), 1999 debut album of the Long Beach Dub Allstars
"Right Back" (song), a song by Khalid from the 2019 album Free Spirit
"Right Back", a song by A Boogie wit da Hoodie from the 2020 album Artist 2.0
"Right Back", a song by DJ Drama from the 2016 album Quality Street Music 2
"Right Back", a song by O.T. Genasis from the 2016 album Coke N Butter
"Right Back", a song by Sublime from the 1992 album 40oz. to Freedom